Trichoglossum is a genus of fungi in the family Geoglossaceae.  They are commonly called hairy earth tongues.  The type species is Trichoglossum hirsutum.

Members of the genus Trichoglossum have tiny hairs known as setae on the spore bearing surface.  The related genus Geoglossum lacks hairs on the  spore bearing surface.

History
The genus Trichoglossum was created by Émile Boudier, who constructed the new genus to include species of Geoglossum bearing prominent setae. Numerous authors have examined this genus since its creation, with many new species and varieties described. Index Fungorum currently lists 47 names, including forms and varieties, while Kirk et al. (2008) acknowledge 19 species. Published molecular phylogenetic research also supports the genus as a well-supported clade.

Location
Trichoglossum species are found in woodlands in North America and Europe, as well as Asia, Australasia, India, and South America.

Species

References

External links
 Trichoglossum at Mushroom Observer 
 California Fungi – Trichoglossum hirsutum
 Key to Club Fungi in the PNW

Geoglossaceae
Ascomycota genera
Taxa described in 1885

ca:Geoglossaceae